Félix Baud (21 July 1901 – 4 November 1996) was a French racing cyclist. He rode in the 1928 Tour de France.

References

1901 births
1996 deaths
French male cyclists
Place of birth missing
20th-century French people